Aserrí is the sixth canton in the San José province of Costa Rica. The head city of the canton is the homonymous Aserrí.

Geography 
Aserrí has an area of  km² and a mean elevation of  metres.

The mountainous canton is delineated on the north by the Poás River. It encompasses a narrow strip of land that traverses the Coastal Mountain Range before reaching the lowlands of Puntarenas Province, bordering the canton of Parrita.

Districts
The canton of Aserrí is subdivided into seven districts (distritos):

 Aserrí
 Tarbaca
 Vuelta de Jorco
 San Gabriel
 Legua
 Monterrey
 Salitrillos

History
The canton was established by a decree of 27 November 1882.

Demographics 

For the 2011 census, Aserrí had a population of  inhabitants.

Transportation

Road transportation 
The canton is covered by the following road routes:

References

Cantons of San José Province